Alan Marriott may refer to:

 Alan Marriott (footballer) (born 1978), English footballer
 Alan Marriott (voice actor) (born 1971), improv comedian, writer and voice actor